Mystacoleucus greenwayi is a species of cyprinid fish.

Common Name 
Greenway barb

Habitat 
Freshwater

Dispersion 
Mekong River and Chao Phraya River

Utilization

References

External links 
http://www.fishbase.org/summary/Mystacoleucus-greenwayi.html

Fish of Thailand
Cyprinid fish of Asia
Fish described in 1940